Sans fil may refer to:
Clermont Sans Fil, a nonprofit association
Île Sans Fil, a non-profit community wireless network
Quartier Sans fil (Guinea)

See also 
Wireless